{{Taxobox
| image = Seaurchin.jpg
| image_caption = Echinometra mathaei
| regnum = Animalia
| phylum = Echinodermata
| classis = Echinoidea
| ordo = Camarodonta
| familia = Echinometridae
| genus = Echinometra
| species = E. mathaei
| binomial = Echinometra mathaei
| binomial_authority = Blainville, 1825  
| synonyms = *Echinometra brunea A. Agassiz, 1863
Echinometra heteropora A. Agassiz & Desor, 1846
Echinometra megastoma M'Clelland, 1840
Echinometra microtuberculata A. Agassiz, 1863Echinometra picta A. Agassiz & H.L. Clark, 1907Echinus mathaei Blainville, 1825Ellipsechinus decaryi Lambert, 1933Ellipsechinus matheyiEllipsechinus pictus (A. Agassiz & H.L. Clark, 1907)
| synonyms_ref = 
}}Echinometra mathaei, the burrowing urchin, is a species of sea urchin in the family Echinometridae. It occurs in shallow waters in the Indo-Pacific region. The type locality is Mauritius.

The colour is quite variable but the test is usually a dark colour. The spines are sometimes green and purple with purple tips or entirely green with purple tips but this sea urchin can be distinguished from other species by a characteristic pale ring at the base of each spine.

Its range extends from Madagascar, the East African coast and the Red Sea to Hawaii.

 Biology Echinometra mathaei uses its spines and teeth (part of the mouthparts known as Aristotle's lantern) to dig itself into the basaltic and calcareous rock where it lives. It emerges from these hollows at night to graze on algae. As with other sea urchins, breeding involves releasing gametes into the water column. Fertilisation is external and the echinopluteus larvae are planktonic. When these settle on the seabed, they undergo metamorphosis into juvenile sea urchins. In the Gulf of Suez, in the most northerly part of its range, it spawns in the summer and autumn but in warmer waters, breeding takes place at any time of year.

Because of its burrowing activities, Echinometra mathaei causes bioerosion of coral reefs. Its natural predators are mostly finfish but there is also some predation by brittle stars and gastropod molluscs. It has been found that in areas where heavy fishing takes place, the number of urchins is increased because their natural predators are less abundant and as a consequence, greater damage to the reef takes place.

A commensal shrimp, Athanas areteformi, lives among the spines of this sea urchin  and its appearance is mimicked by the mantis shrimp, Echinosquilla guerinii'', which conceals itself in a hole in the rock with only its spiny telson visible.

Copper is having a detrimental effect to larvae at 0.02 mg/L, and adults have 48- and 96-h TL50 values of 0.54 and 0.30 mg/L. Fertilization success was also reduced to 50% in 0.18 mg/L, and cleavage of the 8-cell stage as well, at 0.42 mg/L of Cu++.

References

External links
 

Echinometridae
Animals described in 1825